"Friendzoned" is a song by JLC and Swedish singer Robin Bengtsson. It was released as a digital download in Sweden on 17 May 2019 by Sony Music Entertainment. The song was written by Robin Bengtsson, Herman Gardarfve, Carl Deman, Lucas Simonsson and Jonas Fagerström.

Music video
A music video to accompany the release of "Friendzoned" was first released onto YouTube on 17 May 2019 at a total length of three minutes and twenty-six seconds.

Track listing

Charts

Release date

References

2019 songs
2019 singles